Calliclytus is a genus of beetles in the family Cerambycidae, containing the following species:

 Calliclytus macoris Lingafelter, 2011
 Calliclytus schwarzi Fisher, 1932

References

Tillomorphini